In probability and statistics, the class of exponential dispersion models (EDM) is a set of probability distributions that represents a generalisation of the natural exponential family.
Exponential dispersion models play an important role in statistical theory, in particular in generalized linear models because they have a special structure which enables deductions to be made about appropriate statistical inference.

Definition

Univariate case
There are two versions to formulate an exponential dispersion model.

Additive exponential dispersion model

Reproductive exponential dispersion model
The distribution of the transformed random variable  is called reproductive exponential dispersion model, and is given by

The terminology dispersion model stems from interpreting  as dispersion parameter.

Multivariate case
In the multivariate case, the n-dimensional random variable  has a probability density function of the following form

Properties

Cumulant-generating function

with

Mean and variance

with unit variance function .

Reproductive

Therefore  are called reproductive.

Unit deviance
The probability density function of an  can also be expressed in terms of the unit deviance  as

Examples
A lot of very common probability distributions belong to the class of EDMs, among them are: normal distribution, Binomial distribution, Poisson distribution, Negative binomial distribution, Gamma distribution, Inverse Gaussian distribution, and Tweedie distribution.

References

Statistical models